Scherpen is a surname. Notable people with the surname include:
Jacquelien Scherpen, Dutch applied mathematician
Kjell Scherpen (born 2000), Dutch footballer
 (born 1988), Dutch bicycle motocross competitor
 (born 1963), German badminton player